The 2021–22 Professional U23 Development League was the tenth season of the Professional Development League system.

Nottingham Forest U23 and Birmingham City U23 both gained category one status. Manchester City U23 were the defending champions and successfully defend the title.
Leeds United U23s and Crystal Palace U23s were both promoted and Southampton U23s were relegated.

Premier League 2

Division 1

Table

Results

Division 2

Table

Results
</onlyinclude>

Play-offs

See also
 2021–22 in English football

References

2021–22 in English football leagues
2021–22